Tula Small is an Australian Singer/Songwriter and TV personality best known for her role on the channel ten series The Recruits, A reality show following the lives of recruits training to be officers in the NSW police force. Tula is also a singer/songwriter in the process of recording her first full length album, to be released from her own independent label, although previous singles have been streamed at  Tulamusic.

References

External links
 Tulamusic 
 Tula
 The Recruits
 NSW police force

1984 births
Living people